John Phillip "Jake" Fendley (June 12, 1929 – August 9, 2002) was an American basketball player for the Fort Wayne Pistons of the NBA. He was drafted with the fourth pick in the third round of the 1951 NBA Draft. He played two seasons for the Pistons, appearing in 103 career games. In his career, Jake averaged 2.8 points per game, 1.2 rebounds per game and 0.9 assists per game.

References

1929 births
2002 deaths
Guards (basketball)
Fort Wayne Pistons players
Fort Wayne Pistons draft picks
Northwestern Wildcats men's basketball players
American men's basketball players
Basketball players from Chicago
Sportspeople from Oak Park, Illinois
People from Danville, Illinois